Poetry Salzburg Review is an English language, biannual literary magazine published by Poetry Salzburg at the University of Salzburg and edited by Wolfgang Görtschacher. It is a successor to The Poet's Voice, which was edited and published in Austria by British poet Fred Beake, James Hogg and Görtschacher. Since its creation in 2001, the journal aims to present a diverse range of contemporary poetry along with premiere translations into English, interviews with prominent and emerging poets and translators, poetry book reviews and general essays on poetry. As of 2018 the editorial board consists of Robert Dassanowsky, Vahni Capildeo, Keith Hutson. 

In addition to its translations, it is one of the very few poetry publications that features accomplished international English language poets from beyond the English language world (i.e. writers from Austria, Bosnia, Switzerland, Croatia, Greece, Pakistan, Hungary, Germany, Singapore, Finland, Poland, Serbia, Ukraine, and Italy, among others). The Poetry Salzburg press imprint publishes poetry books and collections in English. As of the Summer 2004 issue, PSR features new surrealistic, abstract and fantastic realist cover art by upcoming international artists including Sarah Bernal-Rutter, Leslie Buchanan, David Brooks, Helga Gasser, Paulo Cavalcante, Daniel Y. Harris, Jeanie Tomanek, Siegfried Zademack, Roland H. Heyder, Klaus Wiemann, Otto Rapp, Michael Cheval, Martin-Georg Oscity.

Among past contributors
Ally Acker,
Louis Armand,
Rae Armantrout,
Michael Armstrong,
David Banks, 
William Bedford, 
Nicholas Bielby,
Anne Blonstein, 
Vahni Capildeo,
Robert Dassanowsky, 
Ingrid de Kok,
Raymond Federman, 
Kate Fox,
Paul Green, 
Robert Hampson,
J. Scott Hardin,
Michael Heller,
Fanny Howe,
Helen Ivory,
Abhay K,
Mimi Khalvati,
Katerina Neocleous,
James Kirkup,
Krzysztof Kuczkowski,
Edward Lowbury,
Chantal Maillard,
David Malcom,
Paula Meehan,
Samuel Menashe,
David Miller,
Andrea Moorhead,
Paul Muldoon,
Henrik Nordbrandt,
Alice Notley, 
Naomi Shihab Nye,
Bernard O'Donoghue,
Maggie O'Sullivan,
Andrew Loog Oldham,
Marjorie Perloff, 
Simon Perchik, 
Pascale Petit,
Glyn Purseglove,
Jerome Rothenberg,
Susanna Roxman, 
Nicholas Samaras, 
Sean Street,
Toon Tellegen,
Robert Vas Dias,
Keith Waldrop,
Rosmarie Waldrop,
Liliane Wouters.

See also
 List of magazines in Austria

References
 Poetry Salzburg Review and Press
 Poetry Magazines (UK)

2001 establishments in Austria
Literary magazines published in Austria
Biannual magazines
English-language magazines
Magazines established in 2001
Mass media in Salzburg
Poetry literary magazines
University of Salzburg